is a railway station in Chikusa-ku, Nagoya, Aichi Prefecture, Japan

The station provides access to Tōgan-ji which includes the Nagoya Daibutsu, Nagoya's large statue of Buddha.  The area near this station also includes the Nagoya-area weather station.

Lines

 (Station number: H16)
 (Station number: M17)

Layout

Platforms

References

External links
 

Chikusa-ku, Nagoya
Railway stations in Japan opened in 1963
Railway stations in Aichi Prefecture